Agkonia ovifera is a moth of the subfamily Arctiinae that occurs in Peru. It was first described by Paul Dognin in 1906.

References

Moths described in 1906
Lithosiini
Moths of South America